Lady Sings the Blues is the third studio album by British singer-songwriter Rebecca Ferguson. It was released on 6 March 2015 by Syco Music and RCA Records. The album is an interpretation of songs performed by American jazz singer Billie Holiday, predominantly from her 1956 album of the same name.

Track listing

Charts

References

2015 albums
Rebecca Ferguson (singer) albums
Albums recorded at Capitol Studios